The Blood Oranges is a 1997 erotic drama film directed by Philip Haas and starring Sheryl Lee, James C Ronning, Laila Robins, Rachael Bella, and Aida López. It is based on the 1970 erotic cult novel The Blood Oranges by John Hawkes. The film depicts two western couples, one with children, coming together in the fictional Mediterranean village of Ilyria, and explores the perils of swinging between married couples.

Cast
Sheryl Lee as Fiona
Charles Dance as Cyril
Colin Lane as Hugh
Laila Robins as Catherine
Rachael Bella as Meredith
Aida López as Rosella

References

External links

1997 films
Adultery in films
1990s erotic drama films
American erotic drama films
Films based on American novels
Films directed by Philip Haas
1997 drama films
1990s English-language films
1990s American films